Amphilita is a genus of moths of the family Noctuidae. The genus was erected by George Hampson in 1908.

Species
Amphilita arcuata (Jones, 1908) Brazil (Paraná)
Amphilita punctilinea (Jones, 1908) Brazil (São Paulo)

References

Acronictinae
Noctuoidea genera